Dolly Rustom Nazir nee Byramji (born 1935) is an Indian former swimmer. She competed in two events at the 1952 Summer Olympics.

Nazir won Long Distance Open Sea Championships in Bombay in 1948 at the age of 13 and repeated the win the next year. In November 1950, she bettered the national record for 100  meters backstroke by more than three seconds while winning the All India Swimming Championships.

She married horse breeder and trainer Rashid Byramji in 1965 and moved to Bangalore.

References

External links
 

1935 births
Living people
Sportspeople from Mumbai
Parsi people
Parsi people from Mumbai
Indian female swimmers
Olympic swimmers of India
Swimmers at the 1952 Summer Olympics
20th-century Indian women
20th-century Indian people